Edward John Dugan  was a professional baseball pitcher in the American Association for the 1884 Richmond Virginians. His brother, Bill Dugan, also played for the Virginians.

External links

1864 births
Major League Baseball pitchers
19th-century baseball players
Richmond Virginians players
Richmond Virginians (minor league) players
Newark Domestics players
Kansas City Cowboys (minor league) players
Year of death missing
Baseball players from New York (state)
Burials at Holy Cross Cemetery, Brooklyn